"Sing for the Moment" is a song by American rapper Eminem from his fourth album The Eminem Show (2002). It was released on February 25, 2003, as the fourth single from The Eminem Show and the final single in the United States. The song samples "Dream On" by American rock band Aerosmith.

"Sing for the Moment" received positive reviews from music critics, with many critics praising Eminem's rapping ability, the lyrics, and the "Dream On" sample. "Sing for the Moment" proved to be successful, peaking inside the Top 10 in twenty countries. In the United States, "Sing for the Moment" reached number fourteen on the Billboard Hot 100. It was also a number-one hit in Portugal. The song, along with the original "Dream On", was used in a trailer for the 2016 animated film Sing.

Background
"Sing for the Moment" contains samples of the song "Dream On" by the rock band Aerosmith. Joe Perry plays the guitar solo at the end of the song, and a sample of Steven Tyler singing is used as the chorus for this song. Eminem chants "sing" when Tyler starts to sing the chorus, and Eminem also chants "sing with me" and "come on". Eminem says the words in his live performances as well. The beginning of the song samples the intro of "Dream On" too. "Sing for the Moment" was later released on Eminem's greatest hits compilation album Curtain Call: The Hits (2005).

"Sing for the Moment" mentions John Guerra, a bouncer who Eminem had an altercation with on June 4, 2000, after the rapper claimed he saw him kissing his ex-wife Kim. Eminem deliberately mispronounces his last name as "Guerrera:"

You're full of shit too, Guerrera, that was a fist that hit you! (Bitch!) 

The song reached #14 on the U.S. Billboard Hot 100 Singles Chart, #6 on the UK Singles Chart, and #5 on the Australian ARIAnet Singles Chart.

Eminem performed the song with Tyler during Eminem's 2022 Rock and Roll Hall of Fame Induction Ceremony performance, with Tyler singing the entire first verse of "Dream On" before Eminem began the first verse of Sing for the Moment.

Critical reception
David Browne wrote: "In 'Sing for the Moment,' which includes a tirade against the media and politically motivated prosecutors, the intensity of his delivery overcomes the hoariest of ideas – incorporating a portion of an overly familiar classic-rock oldie, Aerosmith's 'Dream On.' The song becomes a clarion call of suburban kids everywhere, not just an easy route to a hit."

DX magazine concluded that in this song Eminem is dealing with his life and called it "guitar-fueled track." RapReviews was positive: "'Sing For the Moment' may throw his fans a curveball though: a song which appears to sample Aerosmith's 'Dream On' yet simultaneously features the REAL Joe Perry playing guitar. Obviously not a stretch for the hard rock icons though, who are still remembered for recording 'Walk This Way' with Run-D.M.C. back in the 1980s, so it's an enjoyable diversion from non-stop hardcore hip-hop."

Track listing
German CD single

German Maxi CD single

German Limited Edition Maxi CD single 

UK CD single

UK Cassette

Notes
 signifies a co-producer.
 signifies an additional producer.

Charts and certifications

Weekly charts

Year-end charts

Certifications

References

External links

Eminem songs
2002 singles
2002 songs
Protest songs
Anti-war songs
Song recordings produced by Eminem
Songs written by Eminem
Shady Records singles
Aftermath Entertainment singles
Interscope Records singles
Songs written by Jeff Bass
Songs written by Luis Resto (musician)
Songs written by Steven Tyler
Songs about the media
Number-one singles in Portugal
Rap rock songs